Senator Brooks may refer to:

Ben Brooks (politician) (born 1958), Alabama State Senate
Charles W. Brooks (1897–1957), U.S. Senator from Illinois from 1940 to 1949
Chris Brooks (politician) (born 1972), Nevada State Senate
Clifford Cleveland Brooks (1886–1944), Louisiana State Senate
Corey Brooks (fl. 2010s), Oklahoma State Senate
Erastus Brooks (1815–1886), New York State Senate
Francis K. Brooks (born 1943), Vermont State Senate
John Brooks (New York politician) (fl. 2010s), New York State Senate
Mary Brooks (1907–2002), Idaho State Senate
Michele Brooks (fl. 2010s), Pennsylvania State Senate
Patty Pansing Brooks (born 1958), Nebraska State Senate

See also
Michael Brooks-Jimenez, Oklahoma State Senate
Senator Brooke (disambiguation)